Goin' Down Home is an album by organist Don Patterson recorded in Chicago in 1963 and released on the Cadet label in 1966. Although it is the earliest recordings led by Patterson it as not released until after he had produced several albums for Prestige Records.

Reception

Allmusic awarded the album 4 stars stating simply "Includes the Nat Adderley tune "Worksong".

Track listing 
All compositions by Sonny Stitt except as indicated
 "Little Duck" - 4:25  
 "John Brown's Body" (Traditional) - 4:58 
 "I'm Just a Lucky So-and-So" (Duke Ellington) - 4:35 
 "Frankie Mc" (Paul Weedon) - 3:54 
 "It's Magic" - 5:04  
 "Goin' Down Home" - 4:17  
 "Trick Bag" (Weedon) - 5:43 
 "1197 Fair" - 4:49   
 "Work Song" (Nat Adderley) - 5:07

Personnel 
Don Patterson - organ
Paul Weedon - guitar
Billy James - drums

References 

1966 albums
Cadet Records albums
Don Patterson (organist) albums
Albums produced by Esmond Edwards